Sturisoma monopelte is a species of armored catfish endemic to Guyana where it occurs in the Rupununi River basin.

References
 

Sturisoma
Fish of South America
Endemic fauna of Guyana
Fish described in 1914